Žeje ( or) is a village in the Municipality of Postojna in the Inner Carniola region of Slovenia.

Church

The local church on the southern outskirts of the village is dedicated to Saint George.

References

External links
 
Žeje on Geopedia

Populated places in the Municipality of Postojna